Yarlovo Nunatak (‘Yarlovski nunatak’ \'yar-lov-ski 'nu-na-tak\) is the rocky hill rising to 739 m in the north foothills of Giovannini (Lobell) Ridge on Trinity Peninsula in Graham Land, Antarctica.  It is surmounting Broad Valley to the north.

The nunatak is named after the settlement of Yarlovo in Western Bulgaria.

Location
German-British mapping in 1996.

Maps
 Trinity Peninsula. Scale 1:250000 topographic map No. 5697. Institut für Angewandte Geodäsie and British Antarctic Survey, 1996.
 Antarctic Digital Database (ADD). Scale 1:250000 topographic map of Antarctica. Scientific Committee on Antarctic Research (SCAR). Since 1993, regularly updated.

Notes

References
 Yarlovo Nunatak. SCAR Composite Antarctic Gazetteer
 Bulgarian Antarctic Gazetteer. Antarctic Place-names Commission. (details in Bulgarian, basic data in English)

External links
 Yarlovo Nunatak. Copernix satellite image

Nunataks of Trinity Peninsula
Bulgaria and the Antarctic